Cynan (also spelled Conan or Kenan) is a Welsh masculine given name. It may refer to:

 Cynan, the bardic name of Albert Evans-Jones (1895–1970), Welsh poet and dramatist
 Cynan ab Iago (11th century), prince of Gwynedd and father of Gruffydd ap Cynan
 Cynan ab Owain Gwynedd (fl. 1169–1174), Lord of Meirionnydd, illegitimate son of Owain Gwynedd
 Cynan ap Hywel (fl. 999–1005), Prince of Gwynedd
 Cynan ap Maredudd (fl. 1294–1295), Welsh nobleman
 Cynan Dindaethwy, king of Gwynedd
 Cynan Garwyn (fl. 6th century), king of Powys
 Cynan Jones (born 1975), Welsh writer
 Cynan Nant Nyfer (9th century), Welsh warrior

Welsh masculine given names